

Ostrów Wielkopolski County is a unit of territorial administration and local government (powiat) in Greater Poland Voivodeship, west-central Poland. It came into being on January 1, 1999, as a result of the Polish local government reforms passed in 1998.

As of 2006 its total population is 158,407, out of which the population of Ostrów Wielkopolski is 72,577, that of Nowe Skalmierzyce is 5,080, that of Odolanów is 4,960, that of Raszków is 2,037, and the rural population is 73,753.

Neighbouring counties
Ostrów Wielkopolski County is bordered by Pleszew County to the north, the city of Kalisz and Kalisz County to the east, Ostrzeszów County to the south-east, Oleśnica County to the south-west, and Milicz County and Krotoszyn County to the west.

Administrative division
The county is subdivided into eight gminas (one urban, three urban-rural and four rural). These are listed in the following table, in descending order of population.

References
Polish official population figures 2006

 
Land counties of Greater Poland Voivodeship